The Six Days of Rotterdam is a six-day track cycling race held annually in Rotterdam, the Netherlands at the Rotterdam Ahoy. The event was first held in 1936.

Winners

References

External links

 

Cycle races in the Netherlands
Sports competitions in Rotterdam
Six-day races
Recurring sporting events established in 1936
1936 establishments in the Netherlands